Cooke Bluff is a bold ice-covered bluff between Ruecroft Glacier and Rutgers Glacier, to the south of Rampart Ridge in Victoria Land. It was named by the Advisory Committee on Antarctic Names in 1994 after William B. Cooke, United States Geological Survey cartographer in the Branch of Special Maps, 1951–87, who made significant contributions to the mapping of Antarctica.

References
 

Cliffs of Victoria Land
Scott Coast